Ffizz is a British television sitcom created by ITV which ran from 9 September 1987 to 29 August 1989 which followed Jack Mowbray (Richard Griffiths) and Hugo Walker (Benjamin Whitrow), who owned a wine business but never had to actually run it until their accountant died leaving them not only with the work but the surprising knowledge that they were out of money. It was directed by Derrick Goodwin and also starred Felicity Montagu as Griselda and Robin Kermode as Allan. It ran for two series totaling twelve episodes. The complete series was released on DVD in the United Kingdom by Network DVD on 3 September 2018.

Episodes

Series 1
 Lilies of the Field
 And On the Third Day
 Play It By the Book
 Pulling Together
 The Big Chief
 With Friends Like These

Series 2
 Plus Ça Change
 Mother Knows Best
 Love In Store
 A Damn Close Run Thing
 Matter of Principle
 Sickness and Health

References

External links
 
 

1987 British television series debuts
1989 British television series endings
1980s British sitcoms
ITV comedy
ITV sitcoms
Television series by Fremantle (company)
Television shows produced by Thames Television
English-language television shows
Television shows set in London